WJRH (104.9 FM) is a college radio station licensed to Lafayette College in Easton, Pennsylvania, in the Lehigh Valley region of the United States. It is one of the last college radio stations in the United States that is fully student managed and provides fully freeform programming.

History
WJRH first established licensure with the Federal Communications Commission (FCC) in 1946, broadcasting under a Class D educational license on 90.5 FM. As FM frequencies grew in demand, the FCC mandated that stations operating in the frequency range currently provided to WJRH increase their power to serve larger audiences. Since WJRH was only to serve the Lafayette community, it was decided to give the frequency to another facility and relocate to its current home frequency, 104.9. WJRH alumnus have become influential individuals in the broadcasting field, ranging from Engineering Directors for networks such as the American Broadcasting Company (ABC), to public broadcasting policy makers.

Facility

WJRH has been housed for over 30 years in its current location, Hogg Hall. The facility is divided into three sound-proofed rooms. The first is the main DJ studio. This is the control center for all outgoing radio transmissions. Here, DJs can play vinyl records, compact discs (CD), cassette tapes, or carts. The station is currently equipped with a "party DJ" style turntable system for DJs who wish to utilize variable speed turntables or dual-table mixing effects.

The second room is a large studio. Live bands can perform and station guests can be interviewed from this room, with the ability to accommodate up to 8 people at one time. Newly repaired, bands on campus will have the opportunity to display their talents, while allowing DJs to bring more variety to their shows. The third room is a production studio. DJs can record bands in the large studio, mix live feeds from any of Lafayette's sports facilities, or produce promotional "spots" to air during the broadcast day. The end product for recordings is a digital, created by an 8-track digital audio tape (DAT) recorder.

See also
Media in the Lehigh Valley

References

External links
 
 

JRH
JRH
Radio stations established in 1946
1946 establishments in Pennsylvania